Arzon or Arzhon-Rewiz in Breton is a commune located at the extremity of the Rhuys peninsula in the Morbihan department in the  Brittany region in northwestern France.

Geography
Arzon is said to be the French village with the longest coastal area in France (see map). Arzon marks the east entrance to the Gulf of Morbihan.

There are two seaside resorts in the commune:
 Port-Navalo (Porzh Noalou ), dating from the nineteenth century
 Le Crouesty (Ar C'hroesti ), in constant development since the 1970s

Several hamlets are located on the territory of the commune: Monteno, Kerners, Béninze, Tumiac, Kerjouanno.

Tourism
Arzon is a popular summer resort. In winter, fall and spring, only two "gendarmes" (French military police) work in Arzon, but in the summer there are far more to cope with the influx of tourists.

Population
Inhabitants of Arzon are called Arzonais.

International relations
Arzon is twinned with Lahinch, Ireland.

See also
Communes of the Morbihan department

References

External links

 Arzon Town Hall
 Arzon Tourist Office
 Yacht Club Crouesty Arzon

Communes of Morbihan
Port cities and towns on the French Atlantic coast